is Japanese model and actress who stars as Mia Amagishi in Threads of Destiny. She also appears in the NHK Asadora Jun and Ai (2012).

Filmography

Film

Television

References

External links
 

1991 births
21st-century Japanese actresses
People from Wakayama (city)
Living people